Qahan Rural District is a rural district (dehestan) in Qahan, Qom County, Qom Province, Iran. At the 2006 census, its population was 4,260, in 1,348 families.  The rural district has 23 villages.

References 

Rural Districts of Qom Province
Qom County